Anthony Leslie Novis (22 September 1906 – 2 November 1997) was a rugby union international who represented England from 1929 to 1933. He also captained the English team.

Novis made his international debut on 16 March 1929 at Murrayfield in the Scotland vs England match. Of the 10 matches he played for his national side, he was on the winning side on 4 occasions. He played his final match for England on 18 March 1933 at Murrayfield in the Scotland vs England match.

References

1906 births
1997 deaths
English rugby union players
England international rugby union players
Rugby union wings
British & Irish Lions rugby union players from England